Aviâja Egede Lynge (born 1974) is a Greenlandic social anthropologist who actively supports the rights of indigenous Inuit. In her native Greenland, she has contributed to training teachers to appreciate their cultural identity and their indigenous rights. Since 2015, she has been Greenland's Spokesperson for the Rights of the Child (børnetalsmand), a position she has been invited to maintain until 2025. Since 2020, she has been a member of the General Assembly of the International Indigenous Women’s Forum (FIMI).

Biography
Born in Greenland in 1974, Aviâja Egede Lynge was brought up in an indigenous environment. Her parents and grandparents, including a Danish grandmother, were keen on gaining cultural and language rights for Greenland. After attending high school in Greenland, she earned a master's degree in social anthropology from the University of Edinburgh. She takes a special interest in the history of indigenous peoples, both in Greenland and internationally.

From 2006, she headed the department of further education at the University of Greenland where she developed teaching diploma courses and a master's degree programme for Greenland's teachers. She also teaches social anthropology and has participated in educational reforms. She has been active in coordinating improvements in education for the indigenous inhabitants of Canada and Alaska. In 2013, she represented Arctic women at the World Conference for Indigenous Women in Lima, Peru.

In 2015, she was appointed Spokesperson for the Rights of the Child in Greenland. Two years later, she was appointed a board member of the International Work Group for Indigenous Affairs (IWGIA). In 2020, she became a member of the General Assembly of the International Indigenous Women's Forum.

References

1974 births
Living people
Social anthropologists
Indigenous rights activists
Greenlandic women's rights activists
Alumni of the University of Edinburgh
University of Greenland faculty
Greenlandic women